"Review Notebook of My Embarrassing Days" is the ninth season premiere episode of the anthology television series KBS Drama Special. It stars Jeon So-min and Park Sung-hoon, and aired on KBS2 on September 14, 2018.

Synopsis 
A group of math teachers are selected to review an exam. Do Do-hye and her ex-husband are among the group of teachers. Na Pil-seung is the security officer assigned to watch over the teachers to prevent them from leaking exam material. Do-hye and Pil-seung shared some embarrassing moments during their college days. Do-hye tries her best to avoid these embarrassing memories.

Cast 
 Jeon So-min as Do Do-hye
 Park Sung-hoon as Na Pil-seung
  as Choi Jin-sang
  as Teacher Oh
 Seo Sang-won as Professor Bong
 Park Sun-hee as Professor Noh

Awards and nominations

References

External links 
 KBS Drama Special 2018 at KBS
 KBS Drama Special 2018 at KBS World
 Drama Special - My Embarrassing Day at HanCinema

2018 South Korean television episodes
Examinations and testing in fiction